Septa is a genus of small to large predatory sea snails, marine gastropod mollusks in the family Cymatiidae. 

It was previously considered as a subgenus of Cymatium.

Species
According to the World Register of Marine Species (WoRMS) the following species with valid names are included within the genus Septa:
 Septa bibbeyi (Beu, 1987)
 Septa closeli (Beu, 1987)
 Septa flaveola (Röding, 1798)
 Septa hepatica (Röding, 1798)
 Septa marerubrum (Garcia-Talavera, 1985)
 Septa mixta (Arthur & Garcia-Talavera, 1990)
 Septa occidentalis (Mörch, 1877)
 Septa peasei (Beu, 1987)
 Septa rubecula (Linnaeus, 1758)

Synonyms
 Septa blacketi Iredale, 1936: synonym of Septa occidentalis (Mörch, 1877) 
 Septa englishi Newton, 1905 †: synonym of Charonia lampas (Linnaeus, 1758)
 Septa gemmata is a synonym for Monoplex gemmatus (Reeve, 1844)
 Septa parkinsonia Perry, 1811: synonym of Sassia parkinsonia (Perry, 1811): synonym of Austrosassia parkinsonia (Perry, 1811) (original combination)
 Septa petulans Hedley & May, 1908: synonym of Sassia petulans (Hedley & May, 1908): synonym of Austrotriton petulans (Hedley & May, 1908) (original combination)
 Septa rubicunda Perry, 1811: synonym of Charonia lampas (Linnaeus, 1758) 
 Septa scarlatina Perry, 1810: synonym of Septa rubecula (Linnaeus, 1758) 
 Septa spengleri Perry, 1811: synonym of Cabestana spengleri (Perry, 1811) (original combination)
 Septa triangularis Perry, 1811: synonym of Lotoria triangularis (Perry, 1811) (original combination)
 Septa tritonia Perry, 1810: synonym of Charonia tritonis (Linnaeus, 1758)

References

 Beu A. (2010). Catalogue of Tonnoidea. Pers.com.

External links
 Mörch, O. A. L. (1852-1853). Catalogus conchyliorum quae reliquit D. Alphonso d'Aguirra & Gadea Comes de Yoldi, Regis Daniae Cubiculariorum Princeps, Ordinis Dannebrogici in Prima Classe & Ordinis Caroli Tertii Eques. Fasc. 1, Cephalophora, 170 pp
 Dall, W. H. (1903). Note on the family Septidae. The Nautilus. 17(5): 55-56
  Dall, W. H. (1912). Note on the genus Septa Perry (Triton auct.). The Nautilus. 26(5): 59-59

Cymatiidae